Eupithecia molliaria is a moth in the  family Geometridae. It is found in Mexico.

References

Moths described in 1913
molliaria
Moths of Central America